The 2006 United States Senate election in Arizona was held November 7, 2006. The primary elections were held September 12. Incumbent Republican Jon Kyl won re-election to a third term.

Republican primary

Candidates 
 Jon Kyl, incumbent U.S. Senator since 1995

Results

Democratic primary

Candidates 
 Jim Pederson, real estate developer and former Chairman of the Arizona Democratic Party

Results

Libertarian primary

Candidates 
 Richard Mack, former Graham County Sheriff

Results

General election

Candidates 
 Jon Kyl (R), incumbent U.S. Senator
 Jim Pederson (D),  real estate developer and former Chairman of the Arizona Democratic Party
 Richard Mack (L), former Graham County Sheriff

Campaign 
The incumbent, Republican Jon Kyl, was elected to the Senate in 1994 and was re-elected to a second term in 2000; prior to that he spent eight years in the US House of Representatives. Kyl's Democratic opponent for the general election was wealthy real-estate developer Jim Pederson, who served as the Arizona Democratic Party Chairman from 2001 to 2005. During his tenure, Pederson spent millions of dollars of his own money to help Democrats modernize and to elect Janet Napolitano as Governor of Arizona. The deadline for signing petition signatures to appear on the September 12, 2006, primary ballot was June 14, 2006.

Not long after the 2004 election, Pederson's name began being mentioned as a potential Senate candidate for the 2006 race. On July 28, 2005, Pederson formally stepped down as Chairman of the Arizona Democratic Party, further fueling those speculations. In early September 2005, an e-mail was sent from the Arizona Democratic Party's website, inviting people to an announcement by Pederson on September 7. In an anticlimactic move, an e-mail was sent out shortly after the first saying that the announcement would be postponed due to Hurricane Katrina. It was requested that any money that would be donated to Pederson's campaign at the announcement be directed to relief efforts instead. Similarly, a meeting in Arizona of the Democratic National Committee (DNC) was scheduled for around the same time. It was also postponed and the same request was made involving donations. On September 7, 2005, Pederson filed to run for the U.S. Senate. On September 14, 2005, Pederson formally announced his intention to run, in his hometown of Casa Grande.

Although Kyl started the campaign with a sizable lead in most polls, the gap quickly narrowed, especially after Pederson released his array of ads.

Debates 
Complete video of debate, October 15, 2006

Fundraising 
The race was one of the most expensive in Arizona history. As of May 7, 2006, Kyl's campaign had raised over $9 million, primarily from private donations from Oil and Energy companies and large fundraising dinners. Pederson's campaign had raised over $5 million, primarily through a dinner event with former President Clinton and a $2 million donation from Pederson.

Predictions

Polling

Results 
Pederson lost the election by 9.84% or 150,257 votes, despite Democratic Incumbent Governor Janet Napolitano easily being re-elected and winning every county statewide. While Pederson lost it was still notable, as it was the worst performance of Senator Kyl's career. Kyl did well as Republicans usually do in Maricopa County home of Phoenix. Pederson did well in Pima County home of Tucson which tends to support Democrats. Kyl was called the winner by CNN at around 8 P.M. local time, 11 P.M. EST. Pederson called Senator Kyl and conceded defeat at 9:02 P.M. local time, 12:02 A.M. EST.

See also 
 2006 United States Senate elections

References 

Senate
2006
Arizona